Fuquay may refer to:

 Fuquay-Varina, North Carolina
 Fuquay, West Virginia